Gandhi Nagar Assembly constituency is one of the 224 constituencies in the Karnataka Legislative Assembly of Karnataka a south state of India. It is also part of Bangalore Central Lok Sabha constituency.

Members of Legislative Assembly

Mysore State
 1951: D. Venkatesh, Indian National Congress
 1957: Nagarathnamma Hiremath, Indian National Congress
 1962: Nagarathnamma Hiremath, Indian National Congress
 1967: Nagarathnamma Hiremath, Independent
 1972: K. Sreeramulu, Indian National Congress

Karnataka State
 1978: K. Lakshman, Indian National Congress (Indira)
 1983: M. S. Narayana Rao, Janata Party
 1985: M. S. Narayana Rao, Janata Party
 1989: R. Dayananda Rao, Indian National Congress
 1994: B. Muniyappa, All India Anna Dravida Munnetra Kazhagam
 1999: Dinesh Gundurao, Indian National Congress
 2004: Dinesh Gundurao, Indian National Congress
 2008: Dinesh Gundurao, Indian National Congress
 2013: Dinesh Gundurao, Indian National Congress

See also
 Bangalore Urban district
 List of constituencies of Karnataka Legislative Assembly

References

Assembly constituencies of Karnataka
Bangalore Urban district